Jacques is a surname which is the French equivalent of James.

Jacques may also refer to:
 Jacques (band), a British alternative rock band
 Jacques (album), an album by Marc Almond
 "Jacques" (song), a song by Jax Jones and Tove Lo
 Jacques (novel), an 1833 novel by George Sand
 Jaques (As You Like It), a character in As You Like It by William Shakespeare

See also
 Jacque (disambiguation)
 Jacquez (disambiguation)
 Jacquerie, peasant uprisings via jacque, a term for a padded jacket and thus the wearer of it